is a Japanese manga series written by Tatsuya Hamazaki and illustrated by Takeshi Okano. It is the second Digimon manga and was serialized in Shueisha's V Jump magazine from 2006 to 2008. The main character is Tsurugi Tatsuno and is partnered with a Greymon (later Agumon). Tsurugi makes contact with the Digital World through his Digimon Mini virtual pet device and a "Battle Terminal", a virtual reality interface. Digimon can use the technology to materialize in the human world as well.

Plot
Tsurugi Tatsuno is a boy who competes in Virtual Digimon Battle tournaments. When a Kuwagamon appeared in the Real World, his Greymon came to life and protected him. Tsurugi is summoned to the Digital World by Piximon to save the Digital World from the evil Barbamon. Since his Digimon has a hexagon shape on him, it's an Illegal Digimon, meaning that Digimon bearing such symbols can help save the Digital World. Tsurugi's Greymon later De-Digivolves to Agumon and they meet other characters destined to save the Digital World from the forces of Barbamon. Now they must stop Barbamon and his minions before they get all the DigiMemories and take over both worlds.

Characters

Main characters
 Tsurugi Tatsuno and Agumon
 Tsurugi Tatsuno was originally partnered with a Greymon. However, in a battle against Peckmon, Piximon De-Digivolved Greymon to Agumon. Agumon later gains the ability to Digivolve into GeoGreymon. Later, when Tsurugi and GeoGreymon were fighting Shou and Yatagaramon, GeoGreymon gained the ability to digivolve into RiseGreymon. Now, in the System World, after Tsuguri receives the Digivice Twin R, RiseGreymon has digivolved into VictoryGreymon. After defeating NEO, he is turned to stone and reborn as a Digi-Egg.

 Yuu Inui and Gaomon
 Gaomon is the Digimon partner of Yuu Inui. Tsurugi Tatsuno and Agumon first encounter them when Gaomon steals from them. After the defeat of a Tankdramon, they joined Tsurugi in his adventures to stop Barbamon. Gaogamon later was able to Digivolve to his ultimate form, MachGaogamon. Now, in the System World, after Yuu receives the Digivice Twin L, MachGaogamon has Digivolved into Z'dGarurumon. After defeating NEO, he is turned to stone and reborn as a Digi-Egg.

 Ami Kitajima and Pichimon
 Pichimon is the Digimon partner of Ami Kitajima, a friend of Tsurugi who hates battling. Their purpose in the storyline is unknown at this time. In Chapter 11 however, it is revealed that Pichimon carries the DigiMemory of Water and can Digivolve to MarineAngemon. Pichimon and Ami are kidnapped and Pichimon alongside his DigiMemory is taken. With the help of Ami and her DigiSoul, Pichimon breaks free from NEO's body and Digivolves to MarineAngemon to help fight NEO. She has a crush on Tsurugi, and when she returned to the real world, she was last seen in Tsurugi's lap.

 Shou Kahara and Peckmon
 A black Peckmon is the Digimon Partner of Shou and possesses the Bird Digi-Memory, which Barbamon needs to gain total control over the Digital World. Peckmon first appeared when Shou attacked Tsurugi Tatsuno under the guise of the Hacker Tamer "the Black Winged Knight". Peckmon fought Tsurugi's Greymon, causing it to de-digivolve into Agumon, and would have claimed total victory if not for Piximon's intervention. In its battle against MegaKabuterimon to claim the Plant/Insect DigiMemory, Shou Digivolved Peckmon into Yatagaramon. During the attack on Light City, Chaosdramon revealed to Shou that Barbamon told him to dispose Shou and that is why Chaosdramon tried to kill him. Afterwards, he reappears to fight Murmuxmon, making Peckmon digivolve into Ravemon. When Shou and friends met Norn in the real world (about age eight or so) he fell in love with her. He started to hate Tsurugi because he forgot about her immediately and became obsessed with soccer. After battling some bullies who had stolen several little kids' Digimon minis, they grabbed his and broke it. The hate of the bullies, and want of seeing Norn again coursed through him, causing Barbamon to take interest. Barbamon saved Peckmon, and took Shou out of the real world. Shou and Barbamon share the same ideas about Digimon happiness, causing Shou to become his minion right away. In the end, Shou had to say good-bye to Norn and returned to the real world.

 Barbamon
 Barbamon seems to be the main enemy in this manga. Barbamon was able to hijack the host computer of the Digital World, which lied in the System World. His target is to take over the Digital World, and for this goal, he has gathered a large army of Digimon and even a human named Shou (together with his partner Peckmon) to help him. To take over and reform the Digital World as he wishes, he needs the eight "DigiMemories", which Shou is helping him gather. It is later revealed that he was merged with Yggdrasil. In the end, he is defeated by Tsuguri and VictoryGreymon, but not before completing NEO.

 Commandments
 Barbamon has many Digimon working for him. These include a Sealsdramon, a Waspmon, an army of Commandramon, a Mummymon, the Commandment Strategist Datamon, some Armored Trailmon, and an army of BladeKuwagamon. He also has the 3 Commandment Commanders (Chaosdramon, Murmuxmon, and Zanbamon) who lead his Commandments. The 3 Commandment Commanders were defeated, but turned out to survive when it came to the final battle against NEO.

 Datamon
 A Datamon works as a Commandment Strategist for Barbamon. Datamon is shown when he spies on a secret meeting between Shou and Norn. He created the Hot Spring Paradise and piloted an Angewomon robot. When trying to claim the DigiMemory of Water from Pitimon in the Angewomon robot, Pitimon Digivolves to MarineAngemon and Datamon retreats. He also reveals to Tsurugi that he's competing against Shou to get the DigiMemories for Barbamon. He later returns to help in the final battle against NEO.

 Piximon
 Piximon is the general overseer in the Digital World. He is the one who opposes Barbamon and thus calls a human to the Digital World to fight him. However, he is badly hurt by an attack from Sealsdramon, having the Holy DigiMemory taken away from him. It seems that he recovered in recent chapters and reappears during the final battle against NEO with a NurseGuardromon.

 Andromon
 Another overseer of the Digital World who resides in Light City. He is killed by Chaosdramon, but his projection revealed to Tsurugi and Yuu that he placed a virus in his DigiMemory that makes the machine part of NEO not obey him.

 Norn Mikihara
 A girl imprisoned by Barbamon. She was sent by Yggdrasil to learn what Digimon mean to Humans, where she befriends Tsuguri, Yuu, Ami, and Shou. She approached them and asked what were Digimon to them. When she heard that they were all friends and family, she told them to always fight for Digimon. Shou fell in love with her, and then hated Tsrugi because he forgot of the promise. She is actually the manifestation of Yggdrasil's very conscience.

 Yggdrasil
 A resident of the System World and the God of the Digital World. After he sent Norn to the real world, he was forcibly merged with Barbamon.

 NEO
 An artificial Digimon being created by Barbamon. To complete this creation, all 8 DigiMemories are needed. He first appears as a small black blob, but evolves to an embryonic form by merging with the Holy DigiMemory and the Insect DigiMemory (which gives him thorns on his shoulders and mask). It grows a left arm after receiving the Machine DigiMemory and begins to grow a body and fiery hair after receiving the Water DigiMemory (alongside Pichimon who serves as his head). After Barbamon is defeated, it absorbs the Bird DigiMemory (which gives NEO wings) and Darkness DigiMemory (which forms his body) along with a massive amount of data to take on an almost-completed humanoid form. Following his awakening, NEO defeats VictoryGreymon and Z'dGarurumon. NEO then steals the Dragon DigiMemory (which gives NEO a right arm) and the Beast DigiMemory (which gives NEO beast legs) to complete himself. He plans to eradicate both the Real and Digital Worlds, and replace them with worlds of his own creation. Soon, NEO starts to lose control of the DigiMemories. After a battle against VictoryGreymon and Z'dGarurumon, NEO regresses back into the 8 DigiMemories now learning the bond between humans and Digimon.

Minor characters
 Tooru
 One of Tsurugi's friends who gets him to participate in a Digimon Battle. His Digimon Partner is unknown. Throughout the story he tries to find out what happened to Tsurugi who was sucked through the net battle machine.)

 Saito
 Saitou is the first Tamer that Tsurugi battles in the Terminal. His Digimon Partner is a Greymon larger than Tsurugi's. He was defeated by Tsurugi.The Hobbit

DigiMemories
The 8 DigiMemories are pendants that are stopping Barbamon from taking over the Digital World. He will stop at nothing to get them. If he collects all of them, he'll recreate the Digital World in his image. Upon defeat, NEO regresses back to the 8 DigiMemories which rebuild the Digital World. Among the 8 DigiMemories are:

 Dark DigiMemory (symbolized as a dark skull) - Owned by Barbamon. Added to NEO after Barbamon's defeat.
 Bird DigiMemory (symbolized as a bird) - Owned by Shou Kahara until it was stolen by Barbamon, completing NEO.
 Holy DigiMemory (symbolized as a cross) - Stolen from Piximon and given to Barbamon. Now a part of NEO.
 Dragon DigiMemory (symbolized as a dragon) - Owned by Tsurugi Tatsuno. Stolen by NEO to complete himself.
 Beast DigiMemory (symbolized as a wolf head) - Owned by Yuu Inui. Stolen by NEO to complete himself.
 Insect/Plant DigiMemory (symbolized as a beetle horn) - Stolen from MegaKabuterimon and given to Barbamon. Suspected to be now part of NEO.
 Water DigiMemory (symbolized as a dolphin) - Owned by Ami Kitajima until it was claimed from her after her kidnapping and is now part of NEO.
 Machine/Mutant DigiMemory (symbolized as cogs) - Stolen from Andromon and given to Barbamon who uses it as a part of NEO.

Volume list

References

External links
 

Next
Shōnen manga